The St. Louis Bombers Rugby Football Club is a rugby union team based out of St. Louis, Missouri, United States. The Bombers are former members of the SuperLeague, the premier league in the United States.

History

1960s–1990s
The St. Louis Bombers Rugby Football Club arrived on the St. Louis rugby scene in the spring of 1962. Original founding members of the club included Frank Hauff, Gene Gladstone, Tom Jones, Cliff Schlereth, Bob Meyer, and John Himmelman, who the Black side MVP award is named after. The Bombers were a result of a merger between "The Old Blacks" and the "Sisler-Hummel" rugby clubs, two of the most powerful and successful clubs in St. Louis during the 1940s and 1950s. Coached and captained by Frank Hauff from 1962 to 1965, the Bombers immediately took control of St. Louis rugby, winning the Missouri Rugby Union Championship in their first two years and five out of their first six. From 1964 to 1965 the Bombers were undefeated and shut out all league opponents.

In those early days the Bombers played a rugged style of rugby. This was characterized by the coaching philosophy of the day, as quoted from the 1972 Missouri Rugby Union yearbook. "We would rather teach someone who likes to hit how to play rugby, than teach someone who likes to play rugby how to hit". 

The Bombers attracted many talented athletes and rugby players during the 1970s and 1980s, but finished as runner-up to the powerful and now defunct St. Louis Falcon's RFC for most of the two decades. Though the Bombers won several tournament titles during this period, the biggest matches were always against the Falcons. There was never a dull moment when the Bombers and Falcons stepped on the pitch to do battle. The tremendous Bomber tradition of playing hard rugby, supporting your club mates, and having a lot of fun doing it was built during this time. 

In 1985 the Bombers realized the importance of bylaws to guide the organization. Jim Boggeman, Ron Laszewski and a few others created the St. Louis Bomber RFC bylaws that are used by the club today. 

The Bombers put one on the Falcons and won a hard fought Missouri Rugby Union Championship in 1980.

1990s–present
Turning the corner in 1988, the Bombers won the first in a string of Missouri Rugby Union Championships, and have won this Championship in every year but three. This includes sweeping 1st, 2nd, and 3rd, divisions of the Missouri Rugby Union in every year except one since 1996. The Bombers have also shown well in the USA Rugby Western Club Championships, winning the Championship in 2001. 

An exchange program with top-level rugby clubs in New Zealand, such as Auckland Marist and North Harbour Marist, has strengthened the Bombers player ranks over the years. Several Bombers have taken advantage of this opportunity to hone their rugby skills and knowledge, while living in a terrific rugby culture such as New Zealand. At the same time, several Kiwis have made the long trek over the pacific to St. Louis to play hard rugby and just play hard. 

A commitment to compete against the top clubs from across the country, and a strong winning record versus these clubs, keep the Bombers rated as one of the top Rugby Clubs in America.

The Bombers are consistently represented on the USA Rugby Western Select Territorial Team and always have players competing for coveted spots on the USA Eagles National Team. Past Eagles include Jim Dierker, Ron Laszewski, John McBride, Chris Schlereth, Danny Fernandez and John Tarpoff. 

John McBride has had the challenging and rewarding job of coaching the Bombers after legend Ron Laszewski. During Ron's tenure, the Bombers have consistently performed at high levels.

The Bombers have a strong network of alumni in St. Louis and across the country that continue to support and follow the club's activities and successes. Successful on and off the field, the St. Louis Bombers Rugby Football Club continues to grow and improve since its inception in 1962. With dedication and hard work the Bombers strive to compete at the highest levels in American rugby.

Honors
 11 - 1st Division Missouri RFU Championships
 10 - 2nd Division Missouri RFU Championships
 11 - 3rd Division Missouri RFU Championships
 1999 Major League Rugby USA National Champions
 2001, 2003, & 2004 USA Rugby Western Club Champions
 2002, 2003, 2004, 2012, & 2013 "Sweet 16" appearances
 2001, 2003, & 2004 "Elite 8" appearances

Sponsorship
The Bombers have individual sponsorships.  These consist of several secondary sponsorships from local and regional businesses.

References

External links
 

American rugby union teams
Sports in St. Louis
Rugby union teams in Missouri